Exhibit may refer to:

Exhibit (legal), evidence in physical form brought before the court
Demonstrative evidence, exhibits and other physical forms of evidence used in court to demonstrate, show, depict, inform or teach relevant information to the target audience
Exhibit (educational), an object or set of objects on show in a museum, gallery, archive or classroom, typically in a showcase, as part of an exhibition
Exhibit (web editing tool), a lightweight structured data publishing framework
Exhibit, a trade show display

See also
Exhibition, an organized presentation and display of a selection of items
Xzibit (born 1974), a rap artist and TV personality